Dave Connell (born 27 November 1961 in Dublin) was an Irish soccer player during the 1970s and 1980s. He is currently the head coach of the U19 Republic of Ireland women's national football team and works as a Football In Community Development Officer for the Football Association of Ireland.

A classy right back, Connell played for Bohemians, Dundalk and Shamrock Rovers F.C. amongst others during his career in the League of Ireland. He played for Bohs in the famous 3-2 win over Rangers in 1984. He captained Ireland at schoolboys Under 15 level in 1974/75 playing and scoring twice against a Dutch side which included Ruud Gullit, and a Wales side that boasted Ian Rush.

He signed for Rovers in August 1989 and in his three years at the club won two consecutive Player of the Year awards. He made a total of 126 appearances scoring 6 times for the Hoops.

He signed for Ards F.C. and then had a spell at Drogheda United F.C.

He has also played for and  managed Limerick F.C. and having retired from playing managed Galway United in the League of Ireland.

Honours
SRFC Player of the Year: 2
 Shamrock Rovers - 1990/91, 1991/92Player of the Year' Bohemians F.C. - 1981/82

References

 Sources 
 The Hoops'' by Paul Doolan and Robert Goggins

Republic of Ireland association footballers
Republic of Ireland youth international footballers
Association football defenders
League of Ireland players
League of Ireland XI players
Bohemian F.C. players
Shamrock Rovers F.C. players
Dundalk F.C. players
Ards F.C. players
Drogheda United F.C. players
Galway United F.C. managers
Limerick F.C. managers
League of Ireland managers
NIFL Premiership players
1961 births
Living people
Republic of Ireland football managers